Gleann Gabhra is a small award-winning Irish cheese company owned by Dominic and Fionnuala Gryson located in Macetown near the Hill of Tara in County Meath, Ireland, producing a single cheese, Tara Bán, a mild-flavoured goat's Cheddar with a firm texture and brilliant white colour.  Dominic and Fionnuala Gryson began producing cheese here in 2010 using pasteurised milk from his herd of goats.

The farm began in 1996 with the purchase of 20 acres to grow beef, grain and potatoes. An unsuccessful attempt to raise and sell goat's milk led to the purchase of a pasteurisation unit in 2010. They are currently making a wide variety of goat's milk products, and have made claims that goat's milk can relieve a number of ailments.

Awards
In 2010, Tara Bán won a gold medal at the British Cheese Awards as best hard cheese.

See also
 List of goat milk cheeses

Notes

External links
Official website for Gleann Gabhra 

Irish cheeses
Goat's-milk cheeses